You Got Me! is a 2007 Filipino romantic comedy film that tells a love story between three people: the strong aggressive police woman played by actress-host Toni Gonzaga, the shy-type police man played by actor-singer Sam Milby and the bad boy played by model-actor Zanjoe Marudo. It was produced by Star Cinema, ABS-CBN Film Productions. This is the second film to feature Milby and Gonzaga after You Are the One (2006).

Plot summary
Insp.Amor "Moe" Santander (Toni Gonzaga) is a tough chick who's used to going after crooks. But there's also one thing she's running away from ever since her mother died: falling in love. Insp.Kevin Robles (Sam Milby) is daunted by most things, but most especially coming clean with the girl he's been loving from afar for a time now. Meanwhile, Caloy (Zanjoe Marudo) is a counterfeit DVD vendor whom Moe captures, along with his heart. Things get complicated when Caloy enlists Kevin's help to win Moe, just when Moe and Kevin's friendship gets deeper. Who does Moe really love? Will she even surrender to her feelings in the first place? Suddenly her life as one of the best performers in the service suffers.

Cast and characters

Main cast
Toni Gonzaga as Amor Santander/Moe
Sam Milby as Kevin Robles/PX
Zanjoe Marudo as Caloy

Supporting cast
Johnny Delgado† as Allan Santander
Dick Israel† as Glenn Ricafort
AJ Dee as Francis Villanueva
Jayson Gainza as Rene
Pia Moran as Mother of Caloy
Quintin Alianza as Brother of Caloy
Pinky Amador as Mother of Kevin
Toby Alejar as Dad of Kevin
Nuel C. Naval as Syndicate Big Boss
Marco Morales as SWAT (uncredited)
January Isaac as Young Mom of Moe

Soundtrack
"My Eyes Adored You"
Written by Bob Crewe and Kenny Nolan
Performed by Toni Gonzaga and Sam Milby

External links
 

2007 films
Films directed by Cathy Garcia-Molina
Filipino-language films
Star Cinema films
2000s Tagalog-language films